All Three of Us (original title: Nous trois ou rien; also known as The Three of Us) is a 2015 French biographical comedy-drama film written, directed by and starring Kheiron in his directorial debut. The film also stars Leïla Bekhti, Gérard Darmon and Zabou Breitman. It was screened at the Tokyo International Film Festival where it won the Special Jury Prize. The film was nominated for the César Award for Best First Feature Film at the 41st César Awards.

Synopsis 
Kheiron plays the role of his father, Hibat Tabib, born in Iran, convicted for his political opinions under the Shah. Continuing to fight for democracy with his young wife Fereshteh under Iran new repressive regime of the Ayatollah Khomeini, they will finally leave their country with their son Manouchehr for security reasons to live in France.

Cast 
 Kheiron: Hibat Tabib
 Leïla Bekhti: Fereshteh Tabib
 Gérard Darmon: Fereshteh's father
 Zabou Breitman: Fereshteh's mother
 Alexandre Astier: the Shah of Iran
 Kyan Khojandi: "Beard"
 Michel Vuillermoz: Daniel Bioton
 Jonathan Cohen: Chokri
 Ériq Ebouaney: Adama
 Carole Franck: Catherine Hanriot
 Camélia Jordana: Maryam
 Arsène Mosca: Head guard
 David Serero: Iranian agent

References

External links 
 

2015 films
2015 comedy-drama films
2010s French-language films
French comedy-drama films
Gaumont Film Company films
2015 directorial debut films
2010s French films